Zachary Cairncross is an Australian professional footballer who plays as a defender for Bankstown City in the FNSW League One.

Biography
On 10 January 2009 Cairncross made his debut for Sydney FC against Wellington Phoenix.

He has signed to play for the Oakleigh Cannons in the 2011 Victorian Premier League.

In 2014 Cairncross joined the Central Coast Mariners on an injury replacement contract for Brent Griffiths.

In 2023, Cairncross joined Bankstown City FC on a free.

Honours
With Sydney FC:
 National Youth League Championship: 2008–2009

References

External links
Sydney FC profile

1989 births
Living people
Australian soccer players
A-League Men players
Marconi Stallions FC players
Sydney FC players
Central Coast Mariners FC players
Association football central defenders